Zoetermeer is a railway station located in Zoetermeer, Netherlands. The station was opened in 1973, and is located on the Gouda–Den Haag railway. The train services are operated by Nederlandse Spoorwegen.

Train services
The following services currently call at Zoetermeer:
2x per hour local service (sprinter) The Hague - Gouda - Utrecht
2x per hour local service (stoptrein) The Hague - Gouda Goverwelle

Railway stations in South Holland
Railway stations opened in 1973
Zoetermeer